An election of the delegation from Germany to the European Parliament was held in 1994.

Results

References

Germany
European Parliament elections in Germany
1994 elections in Germany